The Sibelius Society of Finland is a society in Finland dedicated to the music of the Finnish composer Jean Sibelius. It was set up in December 1957.  The Society and the Ministry of Education opened the composer's house Ainola as a museum in 1974.

External links
Official Sibelius Society of Finland website

Music organisations based in Finland
Jean Sibelius
Organisations based in Helsinki
Arts organizations established in 1957
1957 establishments in Finland